Jackson Township is a township in Lebanon County, Pennsylvania, United States. The population was 9,352 at the 2020 census.

History
The John Immel House and Tulpehocken Manor Plantation are listed on the National Register of Historic Places.

Geography

Demographics
As of the census of 2000, there were 6,338 people, 2,397 households, and 1,824 families residing in the township.  The population density was 266.4 people per square mile (102.9/km2).  There were 2,478 housing units at an average density of 104.1/sq mi (40.2/km2).  The racial makeup of the township was 98.60% White, 0.28% African American, 0.09% Native American, 0.36% Asian, 0.02% Pacific Islander, 0.30% from other races, and 0.35% from two or more races. Hispanic or Latino of any race were 0.76% of the population.

There were 2,397 households, out of which 28.8% had children under the age of 18 living with them, 67.6% were married couples living together, 5.7% had a female householder with no husband present, and 23.9% were non-families. 20.9% of all households were made up of individuals, and 12.5% had someone living alone who was 65 years of age or older.  The average household size was 2.60 and the average family size was 3.03.

In the township the population was spread out, with 23.9% under the age of 18, 7.6% from 18 to 24, 23.7% from 25 to 44, 24.8% from 45 to 64, and 20.0% who were 65 years of age or older.  The median age was 41 years. For every 100 females there were 93.3 males.  For every 100 females age 18 and over, there were 92.0 males.

The median income for a household in the township was $40,469, and the median income for a family was $45,213. Males had a median income of $32,015 versus $22,654 for females. The per capita income for the township was $18,166.  About 4.6% of families and 6.3% of the population were below the poverty line, including 10.5% of those under age 18 and 7.4% of those age 65 or over.

References

External links

Townships in Lebanon County, Pennsylvania